Manipur is a state in India.

Manipur may also refer to:
 Manipur Kingdom, a former kingdom in Northeast India
 Manipur, Dahanu, a village in Maharashtra state of India
 Manipur (Mahabharata), a place mentioned in the Mahabharata
 Manipura, a yogic chakra
 Mount Manipur, a mountain peak in Andaman and Nicobar Islands, named after "Manipur" of Northeast India

See also
 Manpur (disambiguation)
 Kangleipak (disambiguation)